Dungog Aerodrome was an aerodrome constructed in 1942 by the Royal Australian Air Force as a satellite aerodrome east of Wallarobba, New South Wales, Australia during World War II.

The aerodrome was as a maintenance satellite field for RAAF Base Williamtown near Newcastle.

The aerodrome was abandoned after World War II.

References

Former Royal Australian Air Force bases
Military establishments in the Hunter Region
Former military installations in New South Wales